Chiloquin (Klamath: mbosaksawaas, "flint place" ) is a city in Klamath County, Oregon,  United States. Chiloquin was the pioneer version of a Klamath family name Chaloquin, which was the name of a Klamath chief who was alive at the time of the treaty of 1864. Southern Pacific records also show that a woman named Bessie Chiloquin deeded a right-of-way through the area to the railroad on February 14, 1914.  The population was 734 at the 2010 census.

Geography
The city is slightly east of U.S. Route 97 and slightly north of its intersection with Oregon Route 62. A short east–west highway, Oregon Route 422, links Route 97 at Chiloquin to Route 62 slightly south of Klamath Agency.

The Williamson River flows north–south through Chiloquin, where it receives the Sprague River from the east. The city is near the Winema National Forest, which approaches it from the east and west. Agency Lake is nearby, west of the city and slightly west of Route 62.

Climate
This region experiences warm (but not hot) and dry summers, with no average monthly temperatures above 71.6 °F.  According to the Köppen Climate Classification system, Chiloquin has a warm-summer Mediterranean climate, abbreviated "Csb" on climate maps.

Demographics

2010 census
As of the census of 2010, there were 734 people, 281 households, and 179 families living in the city. The racial makeup of the city was 49.2% Native American, 40.7% White, 0.1% African American, 0.4% Asian, 0.5% from other races, and 9.0% from two or more races. Hispanic or Latino of any race were 6.5% of the population.

There were 281 households, of which 31.3% had children under the age of 18 living with them, 36.3% were married couples living together, 19.9% had a female householder with no husband present, 7.5% had a male householder with no wife present, and 36.3% were non-families. 31.0% of all households were made up of individuals, and 10.7% had someone living alone who was 65 years of age or older. The average household size was 2.61 and the average family size was 3.26.

The median age in the city was 41.9 years. 27% of residents were under the age of 18; 6.5% were between the ages of 18 and 24; 20.6% were from 25 to 44; 30.9% were from 45 to 64; and 15% were 65 years of age or older. The gender makeup of the city was 48.6% male and 51.4% female.

2000 census
As of the census of 2000, there were 716 people, 257 households, and 173 families living in the city. The population density was 890.1 people per square mile (345.6/km). There were 290 housing units at an average density of 360.5 per square mile (140.0/km). According to responses provided by Chiloquin residents who participated in the census, the demographic makeup of the city was 51.54% Native American, 42.60% White, 5.31% Hispanic or Latino of any race, 0.14% Asian, and 1.26% from other races. About 4.5% were from two or more races.

There were 257 households, out of which 40.5% had children under the age of 18 living with them, 39.3% were married couples living together, 21.4% had a female householder with no husband present, 32.3% were non-families, 24.1% were made up of individuals, and 10.1% had someone living alone who was 65 years of age or older. The average household size was 2.79 and the average family size was 3.34.

The age distribution was 34.9% under the age of 18, 7.0% from 18 to 24, 23.6% from 25 to 44, 22.8% from 45 to 64, and 11.7% who were 65 years of age or older. The median age was 34 years. For every 100 females, there were 102.3 males. For every 100 females age 18 and over, there were 92.6 males.

The median income for a household in the city was $20,688, and the median income for a family was $21,250. Males had a median income of $29,167 versus $18,750 for females. The per capita income for the city was $9,604. About 33.5% of families and 31.2% of the population were below the poverty line, including 42.3% of those under age 18 and 5.7% of those age 65 or over.

Education and economy
Chiloquin High School, for students in grades 7 through 12, is in the city, as is Chiloquin Elementary, for students in kindergarten through grade 6. As of 2002, the four largest employers in Chiloquin were Weyerhaeuser (plywood, pressed board), Jeld-Wen (windows, door frames), Klamath Tribes (management, health services), and Klamath County Schools.

Points of interest
The Train Mountain Miniature Railroad in Chiloquin is, according to the Guinness Book of World Records, the longest hobby railway system in the world.  It includes a railway museum,  of total track, and trains that a person can straddle and ride.

Transportation
Chiloquin State Airport

References

External links

Entry for Chiloquin in the Oregon Blue Book
Chiloquin community website

Cities in Oregon
Cities in Klamath County, Oregon
1926 establishments in Oregon